Atlantis Plastics is an American company which manufactures specialty polyethylene films and molded and extruded plastic components used in a variety of industrial and consumer applications.  It had 1,381 employees as of December 31, 2006.

History
Atlantis was founded in 1984 as a holding company, initially with interests in the insurance and furniture industries. From 1986 to 1994 it acquired various plastics industry holdings. In 1987 it was acquired by the equity firm Trivest, which soon spun Atlantis off as a public company but retained an ownership stake. Atlantis is headquartered in Atlanta, Georgia and has facilities in fifteen locations within ten U.S. states (Arkansas, California, Georgia, Indiana, Kentucky, Michigan, Minnesota, Oklahoma, Tennessee, and Texas).  
Atlantis has three business segments:  Plastic Films for wrapping pallets of materials, Injection Molding for parts used in products such as appliances and recreational vehicles and Plastics Extrusion used in products such as residential siding.  The corporation earned $43.6 million in 2005 and $29.0 million in 2006, on sales of $424.3 and $418.7 million, respectively.  The downturn was attributed to the slump in the housing sector.

In 2008, Atlantis Plastics agreed to delist from NASDAQ and move to Pink Sheets following disclosure that the company was not in compliance with the minimum bid price requirement.

Shooting

On June 25, 2008 at the 160-employee injection molding manufacturing facility in Henderson, Kentucky, six workers were killed and another was injured in a workplace shooting.  Among the dead was the gunman, who reportedly retrieved the gun from his car after getting into a dispute with a co-worker and being told to go home by supervisor. The gunman shot the supervisor then opened fire in a break room, and ended the shooting spree by killing himself.

References

Manufacturing companies based in Atlanta
Companies traded over-the-counter in the United States
Plastics companies of the United States
Corporate spin-offs